Grammoxyla hieroglyphica is a species of beetle in the family Cerambycidae, and the only species in the genus Grammoxyla. It was described by Redtenbacher in 1868.

References

Xylorhizini
Beetles described in 1868